FC Barcelona Bàsquet (English: FC Barcelona Basketball), commonly referred to as FC Barcelona and colloquially known as Barça, is a professional basketball club based in Barcelona, Catalonia, Spain. It is a part of the FC Barcelona multi sports club, and was founded on 24 August 1926, which makes it the oldest club in the Liga ACB. The club, which competes in the Liga ACB and the EuroLeague, is one of the most successful basketball clubs domestically as well as internationally. Two times European champions, Barça completed a triple crown in 2003 by winning the season's league, cup and EuroLeague. Their home arena is the Palau Blaugrana, which was opened on 23 October 1971. They share the facilities with the roller hockey, futsal, and handball teams of the club.

Some of the well-known players that have played with the team included Pau Gasol, Rony Seikaly, Marc Gasol, Anderson Varejão, Juan Carlos Navarro, Jaka Lakovič, Šarūnas Jasikevičius, Dejan Bodiroga, Gianluca Basile, Ricky Rubio, Juan Antonio San Epifanio, Saša Đorđević, and Tony Massenburg.

FC Barcelona also has a reserve team, called FC Barcelona Bàsquet B, that plays in the Spanish 2nd-tier LEB Oro.

History

Early years 
Founded on 24 August 1926, the club entered its first competition in 1927, playing in the Campionat de Catalunya de Basquetbol (Catalan Basketball Championship). During these early years, basketball in Catalonia was dominated by clubs such as CE Europa, Laietà BC  and Société Patrie (later CB Atlètic Gràcia) and it was not until the 1940s that FC Barcelona became established as a basketball team. During this decade they won six Copas del Generalísimo de Baloncesto and were runners-up once. In 1956 they were founding members of the Liga Española de Baloncesto and finished as runners-up. In 1959 they won Spanish basketball's first-ever league and cup double.

WHAT WENT WRONG 1960 
The 1960s and 1970s saw the team in decline. In 1961 the club president Enric Llaudet dissolved the team in spite of its popularity. However, in 1962, the club was reformed after a campaign by the fans. In 1964 the league's Primera División was cut from fourteen teams to eight and the club found themselves in the Segunda División after not finishing between the two first qualified teams in the relegation playoffs. However they quickly returned to the top division after being crowned Segunda champions in 1965. During the 1970s the club was persistently overshadowed by its rivals Real Madrid and Joventut.

Revival in the 1980s 
In the 1980s club president Josep Lluís Núñez gave the team his full support with the aim of making the club the best in Spain and Europe. His support produced results and during the decade inspired by their coach Aíto García Reneses and players like Juan Antonio San Epifanio (better known as Epi), Andrés Jiménez, Sibilio, Audie Norris and Solozábal, the club won six Spanish championships, five Spanish cups, two European Cup Winners' Cups, the Korać Cup and the World Championship. However the European Cup remained elusive, ending as runners-up in 1984.

Champions of Europe 
The club built on this success during the 1990s, winning a further four Spanish championships and two Spanish cups. They were still unable to win the European Cup despite playing in a further four finals in 1990, 1991, 1996 and 1997. They also made a record six EuroLeague Final Four appearances. The star player during this era was Juan Antonio San Epifanio.

Their persistence eventually paid off and in 2003, inspired by Dejan Bodiroga, Gregor Fučka, Šarūnas Jasikevičius and Juan Carlos Navarro, they won the EuroLeague, beating Benetton Treviso 76–65 in front of a packed Palau Sant Jordi in Barcelona. They repeated the feat in 2010, defeating Olympiacos by a wide 86–68 in Paris, and that October, they made further history when they beat the two-time defending NBA champion Los Angeles Lakers – including Kobe Bryant and FCB Bàsquet alumnus and Barcelona native Pau Gasol – 92–88 at the Palau Sant Jordi as part of the 2010 NBA Europe Live Tour. The match was also notable for being both a match-up between the reigning NBA and EuroLeague champions and the first time a European team had won against a defending NBA champion. Two FCB Bàsquet players in that game – captain Navarro and point guard Ricky Rubio – either had or went on to play in the NBA.

Recent years 

In the following years, Barcelona would stay on top of Spanish basketball, playing almost all league and cup finals against rival Real Madrid. From 2012 until 2014, Barcelona managed to reach the Euroleague Final Four. However, it could not reach further than the semifinals. Barcelona won the Spanish Championship in 2014, but the next few seasons became absolute disasters, both in the Euroleague, and the Spanish League. However, the team saw a return to form in the Copa del Rey, which was won in 2018, in 2019 and in 2021 defeating Real Madrid on all three finals. In 2021 the Spanish Championship was won for the 19th time —the first in seven years— and only a narrow defeat against Anadolu Efes in the championship game of the 2021 EuroLeague Final Four prevented the Catalan giants from winning the competition for the third time.

Sponsorship naming 
From 2004 until 2007 the club was sponsored by the Winterthur Group, a Swiss insurance company with offices in Barcelona since 1910, which led to the team featuring the birthplace of Joan Gamper, the club's founder, on their shirts. In 2006 the Winterthur Group was taken over by AXA, leading to a change in the club name. In the 2008–09 season, the club's sponsorship changed to Spanish insurer Regal (a division of Liberty Seguros, the Spanish subsidiary of American insurer Liberty Mutual). This sponsorship finished in June 2013.

 FC Barcelona Banca Catalana (1989–1998)
 Winterthur FC Barcelona (2004–2007)
 AXA FC Barcelona (2007–2008)
 Regal FC Barcelona (2008–2011)
 FC Barcelona Regal (2011–2013)
 FC Barcelona Lassa (2015–2019)

Home arenas 

Sol de Baix Sports Complex (1926–1940)
Les Corts Court (1940–1971), located next to Les Corts football stadium
Palau Sant Jordi (1990–1992), after 1992 occasionally used for home games
Palau Blaugrana (1971–1990, 1992–present)
Nou Palau Blaugrana (starting with the 2022–23 season)

Players

Retired numbers

Current roster

Depth chart

Notable players

Players at the NBA draft

Head coaches

Trophies

Domestic competitions 
Spanish League: 19
1958–59, 1980–81, 1982–83, 1986–87, 1987–88, 1988–89, 1989–90, 1994–95, 1995–96, 1996–97, 1998–99, 2000–01, 2002–03, 2003–04, 2008–09, 2010–11, 2011–12, 2013–14, 2020–21
Runners-up (23): 1957, 1971–72, 1973–74, 1974–75, 1975–76, 1976–77, 1978–79, 1979–80, 1981–82, 1983–84, 1985–86, 1990–91, 1993–94, 1999–00, 2006–07, 2007–08, 2009–10, 2012–13, 2014–15, 2015–16, 2018–19, 2019–20, 2021–22
Spanish Cup: 27
1943, 1945, 1946, 1947, 1949, 1950, 1959, 1978, 1979, 1980, 1981, 1982, 1983, 1987, 1988, 1991, 1994, 2001, 2003, 2007, 2010, 2011, 2013, 2018, 2019, 2021, 2022
Runners-up (11): 1942, 1951, 1961, 1977, 1984, 1989, 1996, 2002, 2012, 2014, 2015
Spanish Super Cup: 6
1987–88, 2004, 2009, 2010, 2011, 2015
Runners-up (8): 2012, 2013, 2014, 2016, 2019, 2020, 2021, 2022
Prince Asturias Cup: 1
1988
Runners-up (1): 1989

European competitions 
EuroLeague: 2
2002–03, 2009–10
Runners-up (6): 1983–84, 1989–90, 1990–91, 1995–96, 1996–97, 2020–21
3rd place (4): 2008–09, 2011–12, 2013–14, 2021–22
4th place (6): 1981–82, 1988–89, 1993–94, 1999–00, 2005–06, 2012–13
Final Four (15): 1989, 1990, 1991, 1994, 1996, 1997, 2000, 2003, 2006, 2009, 2010, 2012, 2013, 2014, 2021, 2022
FIBA Saporta Cup (defunct): 2
1984–85, 1985–86
Runners-up (1): 1980–81
Semifinalists (3): 1977–78, 1978–79, 1979–80
FIBA Korać Cup (defunct): 2
1986–87, 1998–99
Runners-up (1): 1974–75
Semifinalists (2): 1973, 1992–93
European Basketball Club Super Cup (semi-official, defunct): 3
1983, 1986, 1986
Runners-up (1): 1987
3rd place (1): 1991
4th place (3): 1988, 1989, 1990

Worldwide competitions 
FIBA Intercontinental Cup: 1
1985
Runners-up (1): 1987
4th place (1): 1984
McDonald's Championship
3rd place (1): 1990
4th place (1): 1989

Unofficial 
Triple Crown: 1
2002–03

Regional competitions 
Catalan Championship (defunct): 9
1942, 1943, 1945, 1946, 1947, 1948, 1950, 1951, 1955
Runners-up (3): 1928, 1949, 1953
Catalan League: 23
1980, 1981, 1982, 1983, 1984, 1985, 1989, 1993, 1995, 2000, 2001, 2004, 2009, 2010, 2011, 2012, 2013, 2014, 2015, 2016, 2017, 2019, 2022 
Runners-up (13): 1986, 1987, 1988, 1990, 1991, 1992, 1994, 2002, 2003, 2005, 2006, 2008, 2018

Other Competitions 
Pohlheim, Germany Invitational Game:
2008
Calonge, Spain Invitational Game:
2008
Bologna, Italy Invitational Game: 1
2008
Sant Julia de Vilatorta, Spain Invitational Game:
2009, 2012, 2014
Runners-Up (2): 2018, 2019
Sabadell, Spain Invitational Game:
2011
Palamós, Spain Invitational Game:
2011
Tarragona, Spain Invitational Game:
2011
Cordoba, Spain Invitational Game:
2014
Trofeo MoraBanc:
2015
Torneo de Fuenlabrada
2015
Trofeo Circuito de Pretemporada Movistar:
2016
Monzon, Spain Invitational Game:
2017
Platja D'Aro, Spain Invitational Game:
2017
Trofeo Memorial Quino Salvo:
2017
Torneig d’invitacions de Les Borges Blanques: 
2018
Torneo Xacobeo:
2019
Badalona, Spain Invitational Game:
2020

Individual awards 

ACB Most Valuable Player
Nikola Mirotic – 2020
Juan Carlos Navarro – 2006

ACB Finals MVP
Xavi Fernández – 1996
Roberto Dueñas – 1997
Derrick Alston – 1999
Pau Gasol – 2001
Šarūnas Jasikevičius – 2003
Dejan Bodiroga – 2004
Juan Carlos Navarro – 2009, 2011, 2014
Erazem Lorbek – 2012
Nikola Mirotić – 2021

Spanish Cup MVP
Pau Gasol – 2001
Dejan Bodiroga – 2003
Jordi Trias – 2007
Fran Vázquez – 2010
Alan Anderson – 2011
Pete Mickeal – 2013
Thomas Heurtel – 2018, 2019
Cory Higgins – 2021
Nikola Mirotić – 2022

Supercup MVP
Dejan Bodiroga – 2004
Juan Carlos Navarro – 2009, 2010, 2011
Pau Ribas – 2015

ACB Slam Dunk Champion
Francisco Elson – 2001

EuroLeague MVP
Juan Carlos Navarro – 2009
Nikola Mirotić – 2022

EuroLeague Final Four MVP
Dejan Bodiroga – 2003
Juan Carlos Navarro – 2010

EuroLeague Rising Star
Ricky Rubio – 2010
Álex Abrines – 2016

All-EuroLeague First Team
Dejan Bodiroga – 2003, 2004
Juan Carlos Navarro – 2006, 2007, 2009, 2010, 2011
Erazem Lorbek – 2011
Ante Tomić – 2013, 2014
Nikola Mirotić – 2021, 2022

All-EuroLeague Second Team
Pau Gasol – 2001
Erazem Lorbek – 2010
Juan Carlos Navarro – 2012, 2013
Ante Tomić – 2015
Brandon Davies – 2021

All-ACB First Team
Dejan Bodiroga – 2004
Juan Carlos Navarro – 2006, 2007, 2009, 2010
Fran Vázquez – 2009
Erazem Lorbek – 2010, 2012
Ricky Rubio – 2010
Ante Tomić – 2013
Nikola Mirotić – 2020
Nicolás Laprovíttola – 2022

All-ACB Second Team
Tomáš Satoranský – 2016
Ante Tomić – 2017, 2018
Thomas Heurtel – 2018, 2019
Ádám Hanga – 2020
Cory Higgins – 2021
Nikola Mirotić – 2021, 2022

Records 
Most points scored in a game: FC Barcelona 147–106 Cajabilbao (1986–87)
Biggest point differential: 74 – FC Barcelona 128–54 Mataró (1972–73)
Biggest point differential (against): 60 – Real Madrid 125–65 FC Barcelona (1973) and Real Madrid 138–78 FC Barcelona (1977)
Most games played with FC Barcelona: Juan Antonio San Epifanio (421)
Most minutes played with FC Barcelona: Juan Antonio San Epifanio (11,758)
Most career points scored with FC Barcelona: Juan Antonio San Epifanio (7,028)
Most assists: Juan Carlos Navarro (932)*
Most rebounds: Roberto Dueñas (2.113)
Most blocked shots: Roberto Dueñas (266)
Most three-point shots made: Juan Carlos Navarro (684)*
Most steals: Nacho Solozábal (611)

Season by season

International record

Matches against NBA teams 
On 5 October 2006, it became the first European team -second of the FIBA, beyond the Maccabi of Tel Aviv and the National Team of the Soviet Union- to win an NBA rival. It defeated the Philadelphia 76ers in the Palau Sant Jordi of Barcelona.
On 18 October 2008, it played the first game of an ACB League team on the court of an NBA rival, the Staples Center of Los Angeles against the Los Angeles Lakers.
On 7 October 2010, FC Barcelona, current champion of the Euroleague, became the first European team and the second FIBA in the History of Basketball to beat the reigning NBA champion, L.A. Lakers, for 92–88, in a match played at the Palau Sant Jordi in Barcelona. Pete Mickeal with 26 points and Juan Carlos Navarro with 25 were the best of the match. In the Lakers, Pau Gasol, former Barça player, was the best with 25 points scored.
On 5 October 2016 it faced the finalist of the Western Conference, the Oklahoma City Thunder. Barcelona lost the match by a narrow margin despite being reduced by the quantity and quality of their injured players. Two basketball players from the subsidiary -Stefan Peno and Pol Figueras - had to occupy the base position.

See also 
FC Barcelona Bàsquet B
FC Barcelona–Real Madrid rivalry
FC Barcelona–Joventut rivalry

References

External links 

FC Barcelona at ACB.com 
FC Barcelona at Euroleague.net

 
Basquet
Liga ACB teams
Basketball teams established in 1926
EuroLeague clubs
EuroLeague-winning clubs
1926 establishments in Spain
Catalan basketball teams